Jerina Branković, or Irina (Ирина), was the wife of Gjon Kastrioti II. She was the third daughter of Lazar Branković and Helena Palaiologina. She had two sisters, Helen (Mary), wife of King Stephen Tomašević of Bosnia, and Milica, wife of Leonardo III Tocco of Epirus.

Gjon Kastrioti II was the conte di Spoleto in 1485, and duca di San Pietro in Galatina in 1495. They had the following issue:

 Costantino (b. 1477 d. 1500), Bishop of Isernia
 Ferrante (d. 1561), Duke of San Pietro in Galatina
 Maria (d. 1569)

Ancestry

References

15th-century Serbian royalty
Branković dynasty
Medieval Serbian princesses
People of the Serbian Despotate
Medieval Serbian people of Greek descent

House of Kastrioti
15th-century Serbian women
Princesses consort of Albania